Streptomyces rubrisoli is a neutrotolerant and acidophilic bacterium species from the genus of Streptomyces which has been isolated from red soil from Liu Jia Zhan from the Jiangxi Province in China.

See also 
 List of Streptomyces species

References

Further reading

External links
Type strain of Streptomyces rubrisoli at BacDive -  the Bacterial Diversity Metadatabase	

rubrisoli
Bacteria described in 2015